Tetralix is a genus of flowering plants in the mallow family Malvaceae, native to Cuba. Adapted to serpentine soils, they are nickel hyperaccumulators.

Species
Currently accepted species include:
 
Tetralix brachypetalus Griseb.
Tetralix cristalensis Bisse
Tetralix jaucoensis Bisse
Tetralix moaensis Bisse
Tetralix nipensis Urb.

References

Malvaceae genera
Endemic flora of Cuba
Grewioideae